The OpenBMC project is a Linux Foundation collaborative open-source project whose goal is to produce an open source implementation of the baseboard management controllers (BMC) firmware stack. OpenBMC is a Linux distribution for BMCs meant to work across heterogeneous systems that include enterprise, high-performance computing (HPC), telecommunications, and cloud-scale data centers.

History
In 2014, four Facebook programmers at a Facebook hackathon event created a prototype open-source BMC firmware stack named OpenBMC. In 2015, IBM collaborated with Rackspace on an open-source BMC firmware stack also named OpenBMC. These projects were similar in name and concept only. In March 2018, OpenBMC became a Linux Foundation project and converged on the IBM stack. Founding organizations of the OpenBMC project are Microsoft, Intel, IBM, Google, and Facebook. A technical steering committee was formed to guide the project with representation from the five founding companies. Brad Bishop from IBM was elected chair of the technical steering committee. In April 2019, Arm Holdings joined as the 6th member of the OpenBMC technical steering committee.

Features
OpenBMC uses the Yocto Project as the underlying building and distribution generation framework. OpenBMC uses D-Bus as an inter-process communication (IPC). OpenBMC includes a web application for interacting with the firmware stack. OpenBMC added Redfish support for hardware management.

Systems
 Google/Rackspace partnership
 Barreleye G2 / Zaius—two-socket server platform using POWER9 processors.
 IBM
 Power Systems AC922 also "Witherspoon" or "Newell"—two-socket, 2U Accelerated Computing (AC) node using POWER9 processors with up to 6 Nvidia Volta GPUs. AC922 was used in the U.S. Department of Energy's Sierra and Summit supercomputers.
 Raptor Computing Systems / Raptor Engineering
 Talos II—two-socket workstation and development platform; available as 4U server, tower, or EATX mainboard.
Talos II Lite – single-socket version of the Talos II mainboard, made using the same PCB. 
Blackbird – single-socket microATX platform using SMT4 Sforza POWER9 processors, 4–8 cores, 2 RAM slots (supporting up to 256 GiB total)

u-bmc 
u-bmc is a project which is developed parallel to OpenBMC but uses gRPC instead of IPMI.

References

2014 software
Embedded Linux
Linux Foundation projects
Out-of-band management